Othello is a 1990 film produced by the Royal Shakespeare Company, starring Ian McKellen, Willard White, Imogen Stubbs, and Zoë Wanamaker.  It is based on a stage production of William Shakespeare's play Othello, directed by Trevor Nunn, and later rethought for TV and filmed in a studio. It was shot in a black box theater, so minimal props or scenery were needed, and aired 23 June 1990 on Theatre Night.

Cast
Ian McKellen as Iago
Willard White as Othello
Imogen Stubbs as Desdemona
Zoë Wanamaker as Emilia
Michael Grandage as Roderigo
Clive Swift as Brabantio / Gratiano
John Burgess as Duke of Venice / Lodovico
Marsha Hunt as Bianca

Production
Trevor Nunn directed the film himself based on his 1989 production for the Royal Shakespeare Company. The sets, costumes, and props are from the American Civil War, but the dialogue remains tied to Venice and Cyprus. In contrast with Antony and Cleopatra (1974) and Macbeth (1979), Nunn preferred "contemplative" medium shots over extreme closeups. The film makes little attempt to hide that it is a filmed stage production. Michael Brooke, writing for BFI Screenonline, thinks this is because Nunn's state purpose was to preserve the stage production for posterity. The film presents almost the complete text of the play, leaving out just one scene with Cassio and the clown.

Reception
The previous film adaptation of a Nunn stage production for the Royal Shakespeare Company of a Shakespeare play, Macbeth (1979), was "widely regarded as one of the finest screen Shakespeares ever", so expectations for this adaptation were "sky-high". Brooke thinks the expectations were "… generally met by a production that holds a very distinguished place amongst filmed Othellos, and is arguably its most successful television translation." He particularly calls out "the beautifully achieved chemistry between the four leads" as among its strongest features.

In the Cambridge Companion to Shakespeare on Film, Carol Chillington Rutter finds a feminist perspective in the film:

Notes

References

Further reading

External links

Films based on Othello
1990 films
1990 television films
Films directed by Trevor Nunn
British television films
Television shows shot at EMI-Elstree Studios
1990s English-language films